Anna Czekanowska-Kuklińska (25 June 1929 in Lwów – 18 October 2021) – Polish musicologist and ethnographer, professor at the University of Warsaw, daughter of anthropologist Jan Czekanowski.

She applied statistical-mathematical methods for analysis of folk music.

Works
 Etnografia muzyczna (1971),
 Ludowe melodie wąskiego zakresu w krajach słowiańskich (1972),
 Kultury muzyczne Azji (1981).

References

1929 births
2021 deaths
Writers from Lviv
Polish ethnographers
Polish musicologists
Women musicologists
Polish women academics
20th-century musicologists
Polish anthropologists
Polish women anthropologists
Academic staff of the University of Warsaw
People from Lwów Voivodeship